The Bayer designations l Carinae and L Carinae are distinct.

for l Carinae, see HD 84810
for L Carinae, see HD 90264

See also
I Carinae
i Carinae
ι Carinae

Carinae, l
Carina (constellation)